Sebastián de Pastrana, O. de M. (1633–1700) was a Roman Catholic prelate who served as Bishop of Paraguay (1693–1700).

Biography
Sebastián de Pastrana was born in Lima, Peru in 1633 and ordained a priest in the Order of the Blessed Virgin Mary of Mercy.
On 24 August 1693, he was appointed during the papacy of Pope Innocent XII as Bishop of Paraguay. 
On 1697, he was consecrated bishop by Melchor de Liñán y Cisneros, Archbishop of Lima. 
He served as Bishop of Paraguay until his death on 4 November 1700.

References

External links and additional sources
 (for Chronology of Bishops) 
 (for Chronology of Bishops)  

17th-century Roman Catholic bishops in Paraguay
18th-century Roman Catholic bishops in Paraguay
Bishops appointed by Pope Innocent XII
1633 births
1700 deaths
Clergy from Lima
Mercedarian bishops
Roman Catholic bishops of Paraguay